Pavetta kupensis is a species of plant in the family Rubiaceae. It is endemic to Cameroon.  Its natural habitat is subtropical or tropical moist montane forests.

References

Flora of Cameroon
kupensis
Critically endangered plants
Taxonomy articles created by Polbot